Eti Maden is a Turkish state-owned mining and chemicals company focusing on boron products. It holds a government monopoly on the mining of borate minerals in Turkey, which possesses 72% of the world's known deposits. In 2012, it held a 47% share of global production of borate minerals, ahead of its main competitor, Rio Tinto Group, which held 23%.

In 2012, it was the forty-first largest industrial company in Turkey, with an annual revenue of $850 million.

It was founded in 1935 as Etibank, a bank created to finance Turkish natural resource extraction; in 1993, the company's banking activities were privatized and its mining activities separated under the name Eti Holding A.Ş. In 2004, the company was restructured again and named Eti Mine Works.

Its subsidiaries include AB Etiproducts OY, a Finland-based company which distributes Eti Mine Works products in Scandinavia, Eastern Europe, Russia, Central Asia, and Africa. Bandırma Borax owns one of the small coal-fired power stations in Turkey.

Ab Etiproducts Oy 

In 1982, Ab Etiproducts Oy was established by Finnish mining multimetal Outokumpu group and Etibank. In 1993 Outokumpu's share was transferred to Etimine SA, sister company of Ab Etiproducts Oy, responsible for the marketing of Turkish boron products in western Europe. In 2005, Ab Etiproducts Oy established a subsidiary company Etiproducts Llc, in Russia.

The company presently operates in Scandinavia (Finland, Sweden, Denmark, Iceland and Norway), the Baltic states (Estonia, Latvia, Lithuania), Poland, Russia, Kazakhstan and other CIS countries.

Stock is located in the Baltic and Black Sea Region regions. The subsidiary company Etiproducts Llc has stockplace in Azov, Russia. Ab Etiproducts Oy controls international sales and distribution of boron products in Finland, Sweden, Iceland, Norway, Poland, Latvia, Lithuania, Russia, Estonia, Kazakhstan and other CIS countries.

Products

Boron minerals and refined products include: 

 Boric acid, Normal Sulphate
 Boric acid, Low Sulphate
 Boron oxide
 Etibor-48 (Borax Pentahydrate)
 Borax Decahydrate
 Etibor-68 (Anhydrous Borax)
 Etidot-67 (Disodium Octaborate Tetrahydrate)

Concentrated boron products include:
 Ground colemanite
 Ground Ulexite
 Calcined Tincal (Compacted)
 Bigadiç Colemanite
 Kestelek Colemanite
 Hisarcik Colemanite
 Espey Colemanite
 Ulexite
 Natural Zeolite
 Sulphuric Acid (Technical / Pure)
 Calcined Pyrite (Powder)

References

External links
 Eti Maden Bandirma power station on Global Energy Monitor

Mining companies of Turkey
Turkish companies established in 1993
Coal in Turkey